Zhuangyuanbei Station is a station on Line 6 of Chongqing Rail Transit in Chongqing municipality, China.

Station structure

References

Railway stations in Chongqing
Railway stations in China opened in 2013
Chongqing Rail Transit stations